Kociha is a village and municipality in the Rimavská Sobota District of the Banská Bystrica Region of southern Slovakia. Part of the village is settlement Suchý potok, which is gradually developing as agrotourism settlement. Important sightseeing is late classical evangelical church.

See also
 List of municipalities and towns in Slovakia

References

Genealogical resources

The records for genealogical research are available at the state archive "Statny Archiv in Banska Bystrica, Slovakia"

 Lutheran church records (births/marriages/deaths): 1713-1883 (parish B)
 Reformated church records (births/marriages/deaths): 1771-1896 (parish B)

External links
 
 
http://www.e-obce.sk/obec/kociha/kociha.html
Kociha photo gallery
Surnames of living people in Kociha

Villages and municipalities in Rimavská Sobota District